David Roper is the name of:

David Roper (actor) (born 1944), English actor
David Roper (footballer) (1944–2005), English footballer